Ophiodes vertebralis, the jointed worm lizard, is a species of lizard of the Diploglossidae family. It is found in Brazil, Argentina, and Uruguay.

References

Ophiodes
Reptiles described in 1881
Reptiles of Brazil
Reptiles of Argentina
Reptiles of Uruguay
Taxa named by Marie Firmin Bocourt